Milionář (English translation: Millionaire) is a single by the popular Czech singer Jaromír Nohavica. It was realized in two versions: Czech and Polish (entitled Milionerzy). The song is telling story of Franta Šiška, whose friend told him to play Who Wants to Be a Millionaire? (Milionář/Milionerzy). He went to the studio, won Fastest Finger First and got to the first question, which was "What is a ukulele?". First, he used phone a friend, but his friend was drunk and didn't know the answer. Then he used fifty fifty and next - ask the audience, 90% of the audience was saying the correct answer - Hawaii instrument. Franta chose the correct answer and won 1,000 korun. Then, without even looking at the second question he decided to resign from playing. At the end, Franta says he'll use his money to buy a ticket back his home town, Ostrava and he will give the rest to homeless people.

Release history

2003 songs
2007 songs
Czech songs
Polish songs
Who Wants to Be a Millionaire?